Nashi may refer to:

Organisations
 Nashi (Canadian organisation), opposing human trafficking 
 Nashi (political party), a political party in Ukraine 
 Nashi (youth movement), a political youth movement in Russia
 Nashi (1990s nationalist group), a former Russian political movement

Other uses
 Nashi pear, fruit of Pyrus pyrifolia 
 Nashi (wind), or N'aschi, a northeastern wind in the Persian Gulf 
 Japanese ship Nashi, two Japanese destroyers
 Nakhi people, or Nashi

See also

 Nasi (disambiguation)
NashiCon, an annual three-day anime convention